The Lyndhurst Draw is a railroad bridge crossing the Passaic River between Clifton and Lyndhurst in northeastern New Jersey. Built in 1903, it is owned and operated by New Jersey Transit Rail Operations (NJT).

Norfolk Southern Railway uses the bridge to access Croxton Yard to the east across the New Jersey Meadowlands. The bridge is required by federal regulations to open on 24-hour notice. It is listed on the New Jersey Register of Historic Places (ID#2950).

Rail service across the river was originally oriented to bringing passengers and freight from the points west over the Hackensack Meadows to Bergen Hill, where tunnels and cuts provided access terminals on the Hudson River. The crossing of the river was developed under the auspices of the  Delaware, Lackawanna, and Western Railroad (DL&W) as part of its Boonton Branch, which in 1960 merged with the Erie Railroad  to form the Erie Lackawanna. In 1963, the Erie's Main Line south of Paterson through downtown Passaic was abandoned and service was shifted to the alignment over the Lyndhurst Draw and the Upper Hack Lift. Operations were later taken over by Conrail under contract with the New Jersey Department of Transportation, and in 1983 by NJT.

See also
Avondale Bridge (Passaic River)
List of crossings of the Lower Passaic River
List of NJT moveable bridges
Boonton Branch

References

External links
NJTR - Lyndhurst Draw at Bridgehunter.com

1902 flood at nytimes.com

Railroad bridges in New Jersey
Bridges over the Passaic River
Swing bridges in the United States
NJ Transit bridges
Clifton, New Jersey
Bridges in Passaic County, New Jersey
Lyndhurst, New Jersey
Bridges in Bergen County, New Jersey
Erie Lackawanna Railway
Conrail
Delaware, Lackawanna and Western Railroad bridges
Bridges completed in 1901
Norfolk Southern Railway bridges